Aristotelia is a genus of moths in the family Gelechiidae. Well-known species are food plant specialists, and diverse hosts are used – Salicaceae, Solanaceae, Rosaceae, Fagaceae, Fabaceae, Asteraceae.

Species

Aristotelia achyrobathra Meyrick, 1933
Aristotelia adceanotha Keifer, 1935
Aristotelia adenostomae Keifer, 1933
Aristotelia amelanchierella Braun, 1925
Aristotelia antipala Meyrick, 1904
Aristotelia aphiltra Meyrick, 1917
Aristotelia aphthoropa Turner, 1939
Aristotelia aphromorpha Meyrick, 1923
Aristotelia aquosa Meyrick, 1925
Aristotelia argentifera Busck, 1903
Aristotelia argodecta Meyrick, 1918
Aristotelia argyractis Meyrick, 1923
Aristotelia articulata Meyrick, 1918
Aristotelia avanica Piskunov & Emelyanov, 1982
Aristotelia balanocentra Meyrick, 1914
Aristotelia baltica A. Sulcs & I. Sulcs, 1983
Aristotelia benedenii (Weyenbergh, 1873)
Aristotelia bicomis Bippus, 2020
Aristotelia bifasciella Busck, 1903
Aristotelia billii Varenne & J. Nel, 2013
Aristotelia brizella (Treitschke, 1833)
Aristotelia brochodesma Meyrick, 1908
Aristotelia calastomella (Christoph, 1873)
Aristotelia calculatrix Meyrick, 1923
Aristotelia calens Meyrick, 1923
Aristotelia callirrhoda Meyrick, 1923
Aristotelia callyntrophora Rebel, 1899
Aristotelia centrosema (Lower, 1893)
Aristotelia citrocosma Meyrick, 1908
Aristotelia chalybeiochroa (Walsingham, 1897)
Aristotelia chlorographa Meyrick, 1914
Aristotelia clavata Meyrick, 1914
Aristotelia coeruleopictella (Caradja, 1920)
Aristotelia comis Meyrick, 1913
Aristotelia condensata Meyrick, 1928
Aristotelia corallina Walsingham, 1909
Aristotelia cosmographa Meyrick, 1917
Aristotelia crassicornis Walsingham, 1897
Aristotelia crypsixantha Turner, 1919
Aristotelia cynthia Meyrick, 1917
Aristotelia cytheraea Meyrick, 1917
Aristotelia dasypoda Walsingham, 1910
Aristotelia decoratella (Staudinger, 1879)
Aristotelia decurtella (Hubner, 1813)
Aristotelia devexella Braun, 1925
Aristotelia diolcella Forbes, 1931
Aristotelia dryonota Meyrick, 1926
Aristotelia elachistella (Zeller, 1877)
Aristotelia eldorada Keifer, 1936
Aristotelia elegantella (Chambers, 1874)
Aristotelia epacria Bradley, 1965
Aristotelia epimetalla Meyrick, 1904
Aristotelia epicharta Turner, 1919
Aristotelia ericinella (Zeller, 1839)
Aristotelia erycina Meyrick, 1917
Aristotelia eupatoriella Busck, [1934]
Aristotelia eumeris Meyrick, 1923
Aristotelia euprepella Zerny, 1934
Aristotelia eurypsola Turner, 1919
Aristotelia flavicapitella (Chrétien, 1915)
Aristotelia frankeniae Walsingham, 1898
Aristotelia fungivorella (Clemens, 1865)
Aristotelia furtiva Meyrick, 1904
Aristotelia galeotis Meyrick, 1908
Aristotelia heliacella (Herrich-Schaffer, 1854)
Aristotelia hemisarca Lower, 1916
Aristotelia hexacopa Meyrick, 1929
Aristotelia hieroglyphica Walsingham, 1909
Aristotelia howardi Walsingham, 1909
Aristotelia iomarmara Meyrick, 1921
Aristotelia iospora Meyrick, 1929
Aristotelia isopelta Meyrick, 1929
Aristotelia ivae Busck, 1900
Aristotelia leonhardi Krone, 1907
Aristotelia lespedezae Braun, 1930
Aristotelia leucophanta Meyrick, 1908
Aristotelia lignicolora Forbes, 1931
Aristotelia lindanella Barnes & Busck, 1920
Aristotelia macrothecta Meyrick, 1904
Aristotelia melanaphra Meyrick, 1923
Aristotelia mesoxysta Meyrick, 1913
Aristotelia mirabilis (Christoph, 1888)
Aristotelia mirandella (Chretien, 1908)
Aristotelia modulatrix Meyrick, 1938
Aristotelia molestella (Zeller, 1873)
Aristotelia monilella Barnes & Busck, 1920
Aristotelia montarcella A. Schmidt, 1941
Aristotelia naxia Meyrick, 1926
Aristotelia nesiotatos Park, 2014
Aristotelia ochreella (Rebel, 1927)
Aristotelia ochrostephana Turner, 1933
Aristotelia ochroxysta Meyrick, 1929
Aristotelia oribatis Meyrick, 1917
Aristotelia ouedella (Chrétien, 1908)
Aristotelia pachnopis Meyrick, 1939
Aristotelia palamota Meyrick, 1926
Aristotelia pamphaea Meyrick, 1904
Aristotelia pancaliella (Staudinger, 1871)
Aristotelia pantalaena (Walsingham, 1911)
Aristotelia paphia Meyrick, 1917
Aristotelia paradesma (Meyrick, 1885)
Aristotelia parephoria Clarke, 1951
Aristotelia paterata Meyrick, 1914
Aristotelia penicillata (Walsingham, 1897)
Aristotelia perfossa Meyrick, 1917
Aristotelia perplexa Clarke, 1951
Aristotelia planitia Braun, 1925
Aristotelia primipilana Meyrick, 1923
Aristotelia probolopis Meyrick, 1923
Aristotelia psoraleae Braun, 1930
Aristotelia ptilastis Meyrick, 1909
Aristotelia pudibundella (Zeller, 1873)
Aristotelia pulicella Walsingham, 1897
Aristotelia pulvera Braun, 1923
Aristotelia pyrodercia Walsingham, 1910
Aristotelia resinosa Meyrick, 1918
Aristotelia rhamnina Keifer, 1933
Aristotelia rhoisella Busck, 1934
Aristotelia roseosuffusella (Clemens, 1860)
Aristotelia rubidella (Clemens, 1860)
Aristotelia rufinotella (Chrétien, 1922)
Aristotelia salicifungiella (Clemens, 1865)
Aristotelia sarcodes Walsingham, 1910
Aristotelia saturnina Meyrick, 1917
Aristotelia schematias Meyrick, 1911
Aristotelia schistopa Diakonoff, 1954
Aristotelia sinistra Meyrick, 1904
Aristotelia sphenomorpha Meyrick, 1930
Aristotelia squamigera Walsingham, 1909
Aristotelia staticella Milliere, 1876
Aristotelia sticheris Turner, 1919
Aristotelia subdecurtella (Stainton, 1859)
Aristotelia subericinella (Duponchel, 1843)
Aristotelia subrosea Meyrick, 1914
Aristotelia swierstrae Janse, 1950
Aristotelia tetracosma Meyrick, 1904
Aristotelia thalamitis Meyrick, 1908
Aristotelia themerastis Turner, 1919
Aristotelia thetica Meyrick, 1904
Aristotelia transfilata Meyrick, 1927
Aristotelia trematias Meyrick, 1913
Aristotelia triclasma Diakonoff, 1954
Aristotelia trossulella Walsingham, 1897
Aristotelia turbida Turner, 1919
Aristotelia tyttha Falkovitsh & Bidzilya, 2003
Aristotelia urbaurea Keifer, 1933
Aristotelia vagabundella Forbes, 1931
Aristotelia veteranella (Zeller, 1877)
Aristotelia vicana Meyrick, 1917
Aristotelia zetetica Meyrick, 1934

Status unclear
Aristotelia chrysometra Meyrick, 1926
Aristotelia impunctella (Caradja, 1920), described as Xystophora impunctella (nom. nud.)
Aristotelia incitata Meyrick, 1918
Aristotelia notatella Dyar, 1904 (nom. nud.)

Former species
Aristotelia brizelloides Amsel, 1935
Aristotelia interstratella (Christoph, 1872)
Aristotelia leptocrossa Meyrick, 1926
Aristotelia sardicolella (Schawerda, 1936)

References

 , 2010: The gelechiid fauna of the southern Ural Mountains, part I: descriptions of seventeen new species (Lepidoptera: Gelechiidae). Zootaxa 2366: 1-34. Abstract: http://www.mapress.com/zootaxa/2010/f/z02366p034f.pdf].
  2009: Beautiful gelechiid moths-Aristotelia baltica A. Šulcs & I. Šulcs, 1983, stat. n. and related species (Gelechiidae). Nota Lepidopterologica 32 (2): 89-97.
 ; ;  2009: Checklist of Gelechiidae (Lepidoptera) in America North of Mexico. Zootaxa, 2231: 1-39. Abstract & excerpt
 , 2013: Aristotelia billii sp. n. découverte dans le midi de la France (Lepidoptera: Gelechiidae). Revue de l'Association Roussillonnaise d'Entomologie 22 (1): 17-19.

External links
Bugguide.net

Aristotelia (moth)
Anomologini
Moth genera
Taxa named by Jacob Hübner